Nærbø may refer to:

Places
Nærbø, a village in Hå municipality in Rogaland county, Norway
Nærbø (municipality), a former municipality in Rogaland county, Norway
Nærbø Church, a church in Hå municipality in Rogaland county, Norway
Old Nærbø Church, a church in Hå municipality in Rogaland county, Norway
Nærbø Station, a railway station in Hå municipality in Rogaland county, Norway